Jean-Louis Grinda (born 25 January 1960) is a Monegasque opera manager and politician. He has been the director of the Opéra de Monte-Carlo since 2007, and he serves as a member of the National Council. Grinda  currently serves as the President of the Commission for the Monitoring of the Constitutional Reserve Fund and the Modernisation of Public Accounts. Grinda is from the political party Union Monégasque, which currently retain one seat in the National Council.

References

Living people
1960 births
French theatre directors
Opera managers
Chevaliers of the Ordre des Arts et des Lettres
Officers of the Order of Cultural Merit (Monaco)
Members of the National Council (Monaco)